Joel Antonio Aguilar Chicas (born July 2, 1975) is a Salvadoran retired football referee. He has been a FIFA listed international referee since 2002.

Aguilar was selected as a referee for the 2007 FIFA Under-20 World Cup in Canada, where he refereed the matches between the United States and South Korea on June 30, 2007, New Zealand and Gambia on July 5, 2007, and Austria and Chile on July 8, 2007. Aguilar was selected as a reserve official for the 2010 FIFA World Cup. Therefore, he did not officiate in any matches during the tournament except as a 4th official.

Aguilar was selected as a referee for the first leg of the 2011 CONCACAF Champions League Final, contested by Rayados de Monterrey and Real Salt Lake in Monterrey, Mexico. Also in 2011, he was selected for the 2011 CONCACAF Gold Cup including the Final at the Rose Bowl Stadium in Pasadena, California. On January 14, 2014, the FIFA Referees Committee appointed Aguilar as one of the referees to officiate at the 2014 World Cup in Brazil. He was once again selected to referee matches at the 2015 CONCACAF Gold Cup, and for the third Gold Cup in a row, he was selected to referee the final match. On January 22, 2016, he was named CONCACAF 2015 Male Referee of the Year.

Aguilar was named as one of the match referees for the 2018 FIFA World Cup.

Aguilar has officiated in various international tournaments at both the club and international level, such as:
 11 Salvadoran League finals
 International Friendlies
 2007 CONCACAF Gold Cup
 2007 FIFA U-20 World Cup
 2007 FIFA U-17 World Cup
 2007 North American SuperLiga
 2009 CONCACAF Gold Cup
 2010 FIFA World Cup qualification (CONCACAF)
 2010 FIFA World Cup
 2011 CONCACAF Gold Cup (including the Final)
 2011 CONCACAF Champions League Final
 2011 FIFA Club World Cup
 2013 FIFA Confederations Cup
 2013 CONCACAF Gold Cup (including the Final)
 2014 FIFA World Cup qualification (CONCACAF)
 2014 FIFA World Cup
 2015 CONCACAF Gold Cup (including the Final)
 2015 CONCACAF Cup
 2016 Copa América Centenario
 2017 CONCACAF Gold Cup
 2018 FIFA World Cup qualification (CONCACAF)
 2018 FIFA World Cup
 2019 Campeones Cup

See also
 List of football referees
List of FIFA international referees

References

External links
 FIFA profile
 
 2014 FIFA World Cup Officials
 
 

Salvadoran football referees
1975 births
Living people
2010 FIFA World Cup referees
CONCACAF Gold Cup referees
CONCACAF Champions League referees
2014 FIFA World Cup referees
Copa América referees
2018 FIFA World Cup referees